The Newfoundland Growlers are a professional minor league ice hockey team in the ECHL based in St. John's, Newfoundland and Labrador. The team began play in the 2018–19 ECHL season and have home games at Mary Brown's Centre. They are members in the North Division of the Eastern Conference and are affiliated with the Toronto Maple Leafs of the National Hockey League and Toronto Marlies of the American Hockey League.

History
The search for a new professional hockey team for St. John's began after the departure of the St. John's IceCaps of the American Hockey League. In July 2016, the Montreal Canadiens, who owned the franchise used by the club, confirmed the relocation of the team to the newly constructed Place Bell arena in Laval, Quebec, for the start of the 2017–18 season. Danny Williams, who ran the IceCaps and owned the team's intellectual property, stated his intentions to find another franchise with the AHL or another league.

From that point two rival groups formed. The first were the operators of the St. John's Edge basketball team and current occupants of the Mile One Centre, who looked to secure a Quebec Major Junior Hockey League franchise for the arena. The other, led by local businessman Dean MacDonald and including ice hockey executive Glenn Stanford of the former IceCaps, were looking to secure an ECHL team.

The ECHL franchise was conditionally approved for the Stanford-led group pending an arena deal but was delayed in late January 2018 after a dispute with the St. John's Edge ownership group over arena rights that led to arbitration. After the lease issue was settled, the ECHL officially approved St. John's for entry into the league on March 13, 2018, to begin with the 2018–19 season, placing them in the North Division of the Eastern Conference. The ECHL ownership group reportedly created a partnership with the Toronto Maple Leafs, which would bring the organization back to St. John's for the first time since the team relocated their American Hockey League affiliate, the St. John's Maple Leafs, to Toronto in 2005. The affiliation would eventually be confirmed on June 14. Among the names considered for the new franchise were Shamrocks, Storm, Regiment, and Newfoundland Growlers. The team announced its name as the Newfoundland Growlers on May 22, the name in reference to the Newfoundland dog, specifically the World War I mascot of the Royal Newfoundland Regiment, Sable Chief. Ryane Clowe, a Newfoundland native, previously an assistant coach with the New Jersey Devils, was named head coach on June 20. John Snowden was added as assistant coach on July 19 after serving in the same capacity for the Maple Leafs' previous ECHL affiliate, the Orlando Solar Bears.

The Growlers played their first game on October 12, 2018, a 3–2 win over the Florida Everblades in front of a sold-out arena. In January 2019, Clowe stepped down due to health concerns and was replaced by assistant coach John Snowden. The Growlers finished the season in first place within their division with 94 points. The Growlers then advanced through the 2019 playoffs to the league finals where they defeated the Toledo Walleye in six games to win the Kelly Cup. The Growlers were the first team since the 1989–90 Greensboro Monarchs to win the ECHL championship in an organization's first season of operations. They are also the first Canadian team to win the Cup.

They did not get to defend their title in 2020 as the playoffs were cancelled due to the onset of the COVID-19 pandemic. The Growlers then voluntarily suspended operations for the 2020–21 ECHL season as the pandemic still had ongoing travel restrictions. In the 2021 offseason, head coach Snowden was hired by the Growlers' AHL affiliate, the Toronto Marlies, as an assistant coach and the Growlers brought in Eric Wellwood as the next head coach. During the 2021–22 season, the Growlers hired Danielle Goyette as a temporary assistant coach when Wellwood was unavailable to coach due to COVID-19 protocols in February 2022, making Goyette the first woman to coach for an ECHL team.

2021 arena dispute
In July 2021, co-tenant of Mile One Centre, the St. John's Edge basketball team, were not given the option to renew their lease despite being in negotiations with the Growlers ownership, Deacon Sports and Entertainment (DSE), to purchase the Edge. This led to a dispute between DSE and the City of St. John's as the Growlers still needed to renew their lease agreement as well, ultimately signing a three-year agreement in August 2021. However, the operations of the arena was continued to be criticized by DSE and tickets were not being sold a week before their first scheduled home game of the 2021–22 season.

On October 27, 2021, the city voted to evict the team citing workplace harassment of arena employees with DSE planning to fight the eviction with a lawsuit. A third-party investigation is underway and the Growlers initially scheduled their first six home games to be at the Coca-Cola Coliseum in Toronto, the home of their AHL affiliate the Toronto Marlies, in case they could not secure a more local arena. They came to an agreement with the nearby city of Conception Bay South to play in their local arena for their first six games. On November 18, DSE and the city came to an agreement to play the rest of the season at the Mile One Centre, which had been renamed Mary Brown's Centre in early November.

Mascot
Buddy the Puffin is the mascot of the Growlers. Buddy, a longtime sports mascot in St. John's was previously the mascot of the St. John's Maple Leafs and later the St. John's IceCaps. Buddy's number is 92, which represents 1992, the year that he was introduced as the mascot of the St. John's Maple Leafs. In 2022, Chris Abbott the long time man under the costume of Buddy The Puffin died. Buddy was then retired by the Growlers. In December 2022 the Growlers introduced Buddy Jr. sporting the number 22.  Buddy was also the mascot for the St. John's Edge basketball team.

Season-by-season records

Players

Current roster
Updated November 23, 2022.

See also
 List of ice hockey teams in Newfoundland and Labrador

References

External links
 

 
ECHL teams
Ice hockey clubs established in 2018
Sport in St. John's, Newfoundland and Labrador
Toronto Maple Leafs minor league affiliates